The Sanming dialect (Central Min: 三明事, Mandarin Chinese: 三明話) is a dialect of Central Min Chinese spoken in urban areas of Sanming, a prefecture-level city in Western Fujian Province, China.

Phonology
The Sanming dialect has 18 initials, 37 rimes and 6 tones.

Initials

 Initials  may also be heard as prenasal  in free variation. When the two initials are followed by non-nasalized rimes, they can be heard as voiced plosives .
 Palato-alveolar sounds  can also be heard as alveolo-palatal sounds  in free variation among speakers.

Rimes

Tones

This feature is quite different from many other Chinese dialects.

References

Central Min